The Nanjing Museum is located in Nanjing, the capital of Jiangsu Province in East China. The museum has over 400,000 items in its permanent collection, making it one of the largest in China. Especially notable is the museum's enormous collections of Ming and Qing imperial porcelain, which is among the largest in the world.

History 
The Nanjing Museum was one of the first museums established in China. The predecessor of the Nanjing Museum was the preparatory department of the National Central Museum, which was established in 1933. Cai Yuanpei, the first preparatory president of the council of the museum, proposed building three major halls, named "Humanity," "Craft" and "Nature". Because of China's political instability in the 1930s, only the Humanity Hall was built. During the Japanese invasion, part of its collections were transferred to Southwest China, and in the end moved to the National Palace Museum in Taipei when the Kuomintang lost the Chinese Civil War. The historian Fu Sinian and anthropologist and archaeologist Li Ji were once preparatory presidents, and the archaeologist and museologist Zeng Zhaoyu was the first female president and also a founder of Nanjing Museum. In 1999 and 2009, extensions were built to the museum.

Buildings 

The main building was designed by Liang Sicheng in the 1930s combining Chinese and Western architectural styles. The front section is structure of traditional style and features a golden tiled roof. In the back is a Western-style flat-roof structure. Added in the 1990s to the west of the main building is an art hall which references Chinese architecture of the first half of the 20th century.

Exhibition halls

There are twelve exhibition halls at the museum. A highlight of the collection is a full-size suit of armor made from small jade tiles held together by silver wire.

Qin Garden
Earthen Ware Hall
Treasure Hall
Folk Art Hall
Bronze Ware Hall
Ming and Qing Porcelain Hall
Wu Weishan Sculpture Hall
Ancient Paintings Hall
Modern Art Hall
Jiangnan Silk Product Hall
Jade Hall
Lacquer Hall

Gallery

Paintings

Lacquer

Ceramics

See also
 Nanjing Municipal Museum
 List of museums in China

References

External links 

 

Museums in Nanjing
1933 establishments in China
Museums established in 1933
National first-grade museums of China